The plume-toed swiftlet  (Collocalia affinis) is a small bird in the swift family Apodidae. It is found on some eastern Indian Ocean islands, the Malay Peninsula, Sumatra, and lowland Borneo.

Its natural habitat is subtropical or tropical moist lowland forests. It was previously considered a subspecies of the glossy swiftlet.

Taxonomy
The plume-toed swiftlet was described by the English ornithologist Robert Cecil Beavan in 1867 and given current binomial name Collocalia affinis. The type locality is Port Blair in the Andaman Islands. The specific epithet affinis is Latin for "related" or "applied". The plume-toed swiftlet was previously treated as a subspecies of the glossy swiftlet but was promoted to species status based on the results of a detailed analysis of the swiftlets in the genus Collocalia published in 2017.

There are five subspecies:
 C. a. affinis Beavan, 1867 – Andaman and Nicobar Islands in the eastern Indian Ocean
 C. a. elachyptera Oberholser, 1906 – Mergui Archipelago off the west coast of southern Myanmar
 C. a. vanderbilti Rodolphe Meyer de Schauensee & Ripley, 1940 – Nias Island off the west coast of Sumatra
 C. a. oberholseri Stresemann, 1912 – Batu and Mentawai Islands off the west coast of Sumatra
 C. a. cyanoptila Oberholser, 1906 – Malay Peninsula, Sumatra, Natuna Islands and lowland Borneo

Description
The back and upper surface of the wings are uniformly dark greenish-blue with a moderate gloss. The throat and upper breast are dark grey merging into large greyish chevrons over the lower breast and flanks, usually becoming white over the belly. This species lacks a pale contrasting rump and has no white spots on the inner webs of the tail feathers.

References

plume-toed swiftlet
Birds of the Andaman and Nicobar Islands
Birds of Southeast Asia
plume-toed swiftlet
plume-toed swiftlet